The 3 arrondissements of the Gard department are:
 Arrondissement of Alès, (subprefecture: Alès) with 97 communes. The population of the arrondissement was 148,139 in 2013.  
 Arrondissement of Nîmes, (prefecture of the Gard department: Nîmes) with 180 communes. The population of the arrondissement was 554,624 in 2016.  
 Arrondissement of Le Vigan, (subprefecture: Le Vigan) with 74 communes. The population of the arrondissement was 39,243 in 2016.

History

In 1800 the arrondissements of Nîmes, Alès, Uzès and Le Vigan were established. The arrondissement of Uzès was disbanded in 1926. 

The borders of the arrondissements of Gard were modified in January 2017:
 two communes from the arrondissement of Alès to the arrondissement of Nîmes
 six communes from the arrondissement of Alès to the arrondissement of Le Vigan
 four communes from the arrondissement of Le Vigan to the arrondissement of Alès
 one commune from the arrondissement of Le Vigan to the arrondissement of Nîmes

References

Gard